Western Arabs is a 2019 Danish documentary film by . The film premiered at the 2019 Berlin Film Festival.

References

External links 
 

2019 documentary films
2019 films
Danish documentary films
2010s Danish-language films